Glenn Adam Pakulak, Jr. (born April 9, 1980) is a former American football punter. He was signed by the Seattle Seahawks as an undrafted free agent in 2003. He played college football at Kentucky.

Pakulak has also been a member of the Pittsburgh Steelers, Atlanta Falcons, Tennessee Titans, Chicago Bears, Oakland Raiders, New Orleans Saints and New York Jets.

Early years
Pakulak attended Lapeer East High School in Lapeer, Michigan where he was a two-year starter as a placekicker, punter, linebacker and wide receiver for the Lapeer East Eagles football team.

Pakulak made first-team all league and all area punter as a junior and senior, averaging 39.5 yards per punt as a junior and 40.1 as a senior. Also all league and all area receiver and second-team all league linebacker as a senior.

Pakulak played basketball as well, making first-team all-League and second-team all-area as a junior. He took home first-team all-league and all-area and honorable mention all-state in his senior year. On top of this he also played baseball with which he earned second-team all-area and all-league. He was granted the school’s scholar athlete award.

College career
Pakulak spent his freshman year at Rochester College where he played basketball and baseball.

Pakulak transferred to Kentucky where he had to redo his freshman year, was redshirted and punted for the Wildcats' junior varsity team.

As a sophomore, Pakulak was allowed to punt the final three games of the season and averaged 37.8 per punt.

As a junior, Pakulak posted an average of 44.5 per punt with opponents having zero return yards in three games. He was selected third-team All America by Football News, an honorable mention All America CollegeFootballNews.com, first-team all Southeastern Conference by the Associated Press, and Football News (2001) and second-team all Southeastern Conference by SEC coaches.

As a senior, Pakulak led the conference and ranked third in the nation with an average of 45.6 per punt. He was selected All American first-team by The NFL Draft Report and CBSSports.com, second-team by College Football News and third-team by the Associated press. he was selected as a first-team all Southeastern Conference by Associated Press and second-team by the leagues coaches. He was a finalist for the Ray Guy Award, given to the nation’s top punter. Was awarded the Mosi Tatupu Award, given to the nation’s Special Teams Player of the Year. While at Kentucky, he majored in Kinesiology.

Collegiate statistics

Professional career

Seattle Seahawks
Pakulak signed with the Seattle Seahawks as an undrafted free agent in May 2003 but was released on July 27.

Pittsburgh Steelers
Pakulak was claimed off waivers by the Pittsburgh Steelers on August 4 but was released two weeks later.

Atlanta Falcons
Pakulak joined the Atlanta Falcons on February 5, 2004, but was cut during training camp on August 15.

He did not play the entire year but did attend a kicking camp in the winter of 2005.

Amsterdam Admirals (NFL Europe)
Pakulak signed with the Oakland Raiders on January 19, 2006. The Raiders allocated Glenn Pakulak to the Amsterdam Admirals of the NFL Europe.

Pakulak appeared in all 10 regular season games and helped the Amsterdam Admirals to a 7-3 record, finishing the season in first place and gaining them a World Bowl berth. Also appeared in World Bowl XIV in which he punted a 69 yarder. He had not been exactly shy of getting in the thick of the action before but became an instant fan favorite for preventing a touchdown by making a solo tackle when one of his punts looked to be returned all the way in front of his home crowd. He earned Special Teams Player of NFL Europe Week 9 honors, in which he punted for a total of 317 yards for 7 attempts, with his furthest punt 59 yards, one touchback and 3 inside the 20, averaging 45.3 per punt. Led NFL Europe with an average of 42.1.

Oakland Raiders
Pakulak was released by the Oakland Raiders on August 28.

Tennessee Titans
Pakulak signed with the Tennessee Titans on January 13. He was re-allocated to the Amsterdam Admirals for a second year of NFL Europe.

Chicago Bears
Pakulak signed with the Chicago Bears on January 29, 2008. One of three punters on the Bears' roster, he was waived on June 1.

Oakland Raiders (second stint)
On August 13, 2008, the Raiders re-signed Pakulak after releasing linebacker Edgerton Hartwell He was waived on August 30 but re-signed to the team's practice squad a day later. However, on September 3, he was released from the practice squad.

New Orleans Saints
Pakulak was signed by the New Orleans Saints on October 29, 2008, to replace the recently released Ben Graham. On November 9, he made his NFL debut with three punts for 145 net yards for a 48.33 average against the Atlanta Falcons. Overall, he finished the 2008 season with 24 punts for 1,144 net yards for a 47.67 average. He was waived on August 27, 2009.

New York Jets
Pakulak was claimed off waivers by the New York Jets on August 28, 2009. He was waived on September 2 after the Jets signed tight end Ben Hartsock.

Washington Redskins
Pakulak was signed to the Washington Redskins' practice squad on October 6, 2009. He was signed from the practice squad on October 10 after starting punter, Hunter Smith suffered a groin injury. He made his Redskins debut with five punts for 212 net yards for a 42.40 average against the Carolina Panthers.  He was waived on October 12 and re-signed to the practice squad on October 15. For the second straight week, Pakulak was signed from the practice squad on October 17. In the next game, against the Kansas City Chiefs, he had eight punts for 286 net yards for a 35.75 average.

San Diego Chargers
Pakulak was signed to the San Diego Chargers on August 31, 2010. He did not the team's 53-man roster.

Oakland Raiders (third stint)
On January 5, 2011, the Raiders re-signed Pakulak.  On September 3, 2011, the Raiders waived Pakulak.

Professional statistics

Personal life
Pakulak's grandfather, Roger Susin, was awarded a Purple Heart during World War II, after losing an arm, and surviving an incident where all of his comrades perished. He was teammate and roommate of, Arena Football League star receiver and former NFL Europe Berlin Thunder star, Aaron Boone, for whom he ended up doing the laundry for a semester over the sale of a coffee table in college. Pakulak enjoys listening to 80s music. His all-time favorite football player is Barry Sanders.

In 2005, Pakulak did not play for any NFL or NFL Europa team, but instead spent the year working at a steel factory and training in New Orleans with his college friend Shane Boyd (who also played in NFL Europa in 2006, but as quarterback for the Cologne Centurions). Pakulak also returned to Lexington to follow some classes there.

Pakulak appeared on the Bravo television series Most Eligible Dallas in 2011.

Pakulak also appeared on the GSN television gameshow America Says in 2019.

References

External links

Kentucky Wildcats bio

1980 births
Living people
Sportspeople from Pontiac, Michigan
Players of American football from Michigan
American football punters
Kentucky Wildcats baseball players
Kentucky Wildcats football players
Seattle Seahawks players
Pittsburgh Steelers players
Atlanta Falcons players
Oakland Raiders players
Amsterdam Admirals players
Tennessee Titans players
Chicago Bears players
New Orleans Saints players
New York Jets players
Washington Redskins players
American people of Polish descent